Parliamentary elections were held in Ceylon on 19 March 1960.

Background
By 1960, Ceylon's governing Mahajana Eksath Peramuna (MEP) coalition was falling apart.  The Marxist parties that were junior partners of the coalition had broken with the dominant Sri Lanka Freedom Party over the issue of paddy lands.  The Marxist Viplavakari Lanka Sama Samaja Party formed a new party that took the name MEP.  The SLFP itself had been torn by an internal power struggle since the death of its leader, S. W. R. D. Bandaranaike, the previous year.

Both the United National Party and the SLFP campaigned on a strongly anti-Tamil line, promising to repatriate the estate Tamils to India, and implement the Sinhala Only Act.

Results
Dudley Senanayake and the UNP obtained a plurality of seats, but without a majority could not form a stable government.  This led to the July 1960 elections.

Provincial results

Western Province

Colombo District

Gampaha District

Kalutara District

Central Province

Matale District

Kandy District

Nuwaraeliya District

Southern Province

Galle District

Matara District

Hambantota District

Northern Province

Jaffna District

Vanni District

Eastern Province

Trincomalee District

Batticaloa District

North Western Province

Puttalam and Kurunegaka Districts

North Central Province

Anuradapura District

Polonnaruwa District

Uva Province

Badulla District

Monaragala District

Sabaragamuwa Province

Kegalle District

Ratnapura District

Notes

References

 
 
 
 

 
Ceylon
1960 03
Ceylon
1960